Abisha III ben Phinhas ben Yitzhaq ben Shalma was the 123rd Samaritan High Priest from 1943–1961. He is a member of the house of Pinhas, descendants of Pinhas ben Yitzhaq ben Shalma, and brother of the previous high priest Matzliach ben Phinhas ben Yitzhaq ben Shalma

References

1880 births

1961 deaths

Samaritan high priests